Allahyar and the Legend of Markhor is a Pakistani computer animated film directed by Uzair Zaheer Khan. It depicts the story of a young boy and his relationship with animals. The film is produced by 3rd World Studios and distributed by ARY Films. Set in the northern regions of Pakistan, the story follows Allahyar, a young and mischievous boy who ends up dealing with circumstances he never thought possible. The movie aims to shed light on the preservation and illegal hunting of wildlife, with main characters Mehru (a markhor), Hero (a Chukar partridge, known as chakor in Pakistan), and a snow leopard named Chak'ku being endangered species.

The film received a largely positive reaction by the general audience but received mixed to positive reviews by critics.

Cast
 Anum Zaidi as Allahyar
 Natasha Humera Ejaz as Mehru
 Ali Noor as Mani
 Azfar Jafri as Hero
 Abdul Nabi Jamali as Chak'ku
 Arieb Azhar as Bablu
 Hareem Farooq
 Ali Rehman Khan
 Nadia Jamil
 Arshad Mehmood as Master Jee
 Amjad Chaudary
 Ahmed Ali

Production
The movie was produced by 3rd World Studios for which the studio was awarded a dev grant by Epic games. It is the first movie produced entirely in Unreal Engine. The first song of the movie, a rendition of Zohaib Hassan's 1982 song "Muskuraye Ja", song by Natasha Humera Ejaz and produced by Ahmed Ali, was officially released on 13 January 2018. The film was directed by Uzair Zaheer Khan, a Pakistani film director, screenwriter, and computer graphics artist, who is also scheduled to direct the upcoming sequel Allahyar and the 100 Flowers of God.

Reception
The film received attention by the media even soon after the initial teasers and trailers. It was admired for its theme on the awareness about wildlife conservation as well as being a movie featuring a child protagonist which is not common in Pakistan.

Maleeha Mengal from Dunya News noted that the movie would "remain one of the most memorable stories for children for many years". It was also well received because producing animated movies is harder and costly.

Accolades
The film won the prestigious Monolith Award for Content at the Infinity Film Festival at Hollywood. It was also screened at South Asian International Film Festival (SAIFF) at New York, where it received Best Feature Film in the Audience Choice category.

Sequel 
A sequel titled Allahyar and the 100 Flowers of God will release on 2 June 2023.

See also 

 List of Pakistani animated films

References

External links
 
 Movie Page at ARY Films
 3rd World Studios
 Official Trailor

2018 films
2018 computer-animated films
Pakistani animated films
Animated films about cats
Animated films about mammals
Animated films about birds